In mathematics, the Favard constant, also called the Akhiezer–Krein–Favard  constant, of order r is defined as 

This constant is named after the French mathematician Jean Favard, and after the  Soviet mathematicians Naum Akhiezer and Mark Krein.

Particular values

Uses
This constant is used in solutions of several extremal problems, for example

 Favard's constant is the sharp constant in Jackson's inequality for trigonometric polynomials
 the sharp constants in the Landau–Kolmogorov inequality are expressed via Favard's constants
 Norms of periodic perfect splines.

References
 

Mathematical constants